Bale Telipaale is an Indian Tulu language comedy competition show that premiered on Namma TV in December, 2014. It become one of Tulu Nadu's most watched shows.

References 

Tulu language
Television stations in Mangalore
Indian comedy television series
24-hour television news channels in India